Frede Jensen (2 February 1919 - 8 August 1970) was a Danish amateur football (soccer) player, who played for Køge Boldklub in Denmark. He was the top goalscorer of the 1940 Danish football championship, and played one game for the Denmark national football team.

References

External links
Danish national team profile

1919 births
1970 deaths
Danish men's footballers
Denmark international footballers
Køge Boldklub players
Association football forwards